The 2020 Copa do Brasil fourth round was the fourth round of the 2020 Copa do Brasil football competition. It was played behind closed doors from 16 to 24 September 2020. A total of 10 teams competed in the fourth round to decide five places in the final rounds of the 2020 Copa do Brasil.

Draw
The draw for the fourth round was held on 1 September 2020, 11:30 at CBF headquarters in Rio de Janeiro. The 10 qualified teams were drawn in a single group (CBF ranking shown in parentheses).

Format
In the fourth round, each tie was played on a home-and-away two-legged basis. If the aggregate score was level, the second-leg match would go straight to the penalty shoot-out to determine the winner.

Matches
All times are Brasília time, BRT (UTC−3)

|}

Match 71

Atlético Goianiense won 3–2 on aggregate and advanced to the round of 16.

Match 72

Ceará won 7–1 on aggregate and advanced to the round of 16.

Match 73

Botafogo won 1–0 on aggregate and advanced to the round of 16.

Match 74

América Mineiro won 5–3 on aggregate and advanced to the round of 16.

Match 75

Juventude won 2–1 on aggregate and advanced to the round of 16.

References

2020 Copa do Brasil